Lan Tung is an erhu performer, concert producer, administrator and composer playing a dynamic role in the Canadian music community .  Originally from Taiwan, she incorporates Chinese music with contemporary expressions in her works. At the same time, her strong interest in music outside her tradition has been a major drive in her artistic explorations. As the leader of the Juno Award nominated Orchid Ensemble, Tung has toured extensively in North America, working with composers, musicians, dancers, visual and media artists of various cultural backgrounds.

Tung has been playing the erhu for more than twenty years. She received her training at the Chinese Cultural University in Taiwan, where she has won numerous first prizes in national music competitions. She was a member of Taipei Youth Chinese Orchestra, and she has studied with Huang Ching-Ming, Chen Su-Feng and Lee Chun Tung in Taiwan, Ng K-B in Vancouver, the world-renowned American Chinese virtuoso Jebing Chen and the principal erhu player of the China Radio Orchestra Fun Ming Zhang.

Since moving to Canada in 1994, Tung has premiered numerous contemporary compositions, including chamber, solo, orchestral and electro-acoustic works, by Canadian composers John Oliver, Hope Lee, Moshe Denburg, Mark Armanini, Jin Zhang, Janet Danielson, Michael Vincent, Neil Weisensel, Paul Plimley, Ya-Wen V. Wang, Farshid Samandari, Grace Lee, and Michael John. Her fascination for creative improvisation has driven her to perform with a number of Vancouver's most innovative improvisers, including Coat Cooke, Ron Samworth, and the Crossing Borders Ensemble. Tung recently completed an intensive course at the Vancouver Creative Music Institute, where she studied and performed with Han Bennink (Holland) and John Butcher (UK).

Tung has been studying with Hindustani violinist Kala Ramnath in Bombay since 2004. She has also studied with improviser and contemporary violinist Mary Oliver in Amsterdam and with Egyptian violinist Dr. Alfred Gamil in Cairo.

Tung is active in a number of cross-cultural musical projects. In Egypt, she joined qanoun player Hossan Shaker and his band Rahala in concerts. In Canada, she has collaborated with Persian santur player Alan Kushan, Hindustani sitar player James Hamilton, Carnatic singer Vidyasagar Vankayala, Vietnamese group Khac Chi Ensemble, Multi-instrumentalist Randy Raine-Reusch, Klezmer woodwind player Mike Braverman, African drummer Mandido Morris, Mozaico Flamenco Dance Theatre, Uzume Taiko, and Celtic band Mad Pudding. She has appeared on festival stages as a guest with the Tuvan ensemble Huun-Huur-Tu, UK's premiere African/World Music band Baka Beyond, and Canadian folk legend Bill Bourne. Tung performs with the Vancouver Inter-Cultural Orchestra and currently serves on its board as the vice president. Since 2003, she has been performing with Tandava, moving one more step further to fuse with Indian and Central Asian traditions.

In 1997, Tung founded the Orchid Ensemble. With a unique instrumentation of erhu, zheng, and percussion, including the western concert marimba, the ensemble combines musical traditions from China and beyond, creating a distinct new sound. Its unique instrumentation has been Tung's major vehicle in music writing. Her rearranged Chinese melodies act as bridges to connect Chinese music with western ears, and she is always experimenting with new ideas from her international travels and studies to expand her musical vocabulary. The ensemble's repertoire ranges from traditional and contemporary music of China, World Music, New Music to Creative Improvisation.

Tung gives close to one hundred performances and presentations internationally every year, including music festivals, community concerts, school demonstrations, lectures, and university/college residencies. US appearances included Kennedy Center for the Performing Arts and the Smithsonian Institution, Detroit Institute of the Arts and at Bena Roya Hall for the Seattle Symphony Society. National performances included Ottawa's Canada Day Celebrations, Harbourfront Centre, Toronto Street Fest, The Music Gallery, Royal Conservatory of Music, Vancouver Jazz, Folk and Children's festivals, Canada National Arts Gallery, National Library of Canada, Ottawa Jazz Festival, Ottawa Bluefest, Halifax's JazzEast, Sunfest, Montreal's Centre Pierre Peladeau and Chapelle Historique du Bon Pasteur.

Tung has recorded at numerous broadcast performances for CBC ("Canada Now", "The World in Performance", "Westcoast Performance", "This Morning", "Global Village" and "North by Northwest"), Radio Canada, BBC, and CBC TV ("Zed TV" and "Newsworld") and appeared as a guest artist on various CDs.

References 

Erhu players
Living people
Year of birth missing (living people)
Taiwanese emigrants to Canada